The Miss Ecuador 1990, Jéssica Núñez, was crowned on January 8, 1990 in Telecentro by Miss Ecuador 1989, Eugenia Molina from Guayas. She represented her country in Miss Universe 1990.

Casting

A casting was held in 1990 to select an Ecuadorian representative to compete at Miss Universe 1990.

References

External links

Miss Ecuador